Hutchison Whampoa Property Group was the property development and investment arm of Hutchison Whampoa of Hong Kong.

In 2015, the company was spun-out of Cheung Kong Holdings to form part of Cheung Kong Property Holdings. Hutchison Whampoa Properties Limited has since been renamed Hutchison Property Group Limited (和記地產集團有限公司).

History
The company was formerly Hutchison Properties Limited (HPL). HPL was incorporated in 1971, as a wholly owned subsidiary of Hutchison International Limited (HIL). Shortly afterwards, it became a listed company and acquired the major property interests of HIL and its trading subsidiaries.

In 1980, HPL was privatized by Hutchison Whampoa Limited (HWL), making it once again a wholly owned subsidiary. In 1993, HWL formed Hutchison Whampoa Properties Limited to hold all the property interests of HWD, HPL and HWL's newly privatised subsidiary, CIHL.

Properties
Whampoa Garden
Rambler Crest
Cheung Kong Centre
Provident Centre
South Horizons
Laguna City
Caribbean Coast

References

External links
 

Real estate companies established in 1971
Land developers of Hong Kong
Companies formerly listed on the Hong Kong Stock Exchange
CK Hutchison Holdings
1971 establishments in Hong Kong